Mohammad Khaled (6 July 1922 - 21 December 2003) was a Bangladeshi politician, academician and journalist who was a Member of Parliament for Chittagong-6 constituency. He was awarded the "Swadhinata Puraskar" by the Government of Bangladesh in 2019 for his unique general contribution to the war of liberation.

Birth and early life 
Mohammad Khaled was born on 6 July 1922 in Patna, the capital of the then British Indian state of Bihar, to the work of his father Abdul Hadi Chowdhury. His ancestral home is Daroga Bari in Sultanpur village of Raozan in Chittagong. He completed his higher secondary and bachelor's degree from Chittagong College in 1942 and obtained his MA degree in History of Islam from Calcutta University.

Political and career 
Mohammad Khaled was the editor of the daily Azadi from 1962 to 2003. He joined the anti-British movement in 1944 while studying at Calcutta University. He joined the Awami Muslim League in 1949. He played an active role in the education movement of 1962, the six-point movement of 1966 and the mass movement of 1969.

In the election of the then Pakistan National Assembly in 1970, he was elected as a member of the National Assembly by defeating the Speaker of the National Assembly Fazlul Quader Chowdhury from Raozan-Hathazari parliamentary seat by a huge margin. During the War of Liberation in 1971, he was a member of the editorial board of 'Joy Bangla' published as the mouthpiece of the Mujibnagar government. In 1972, he became a member of the 32-member Bangladesh Constitution Committee and contributed to the drafting of the constitution.

He was elected to parliament from Chittagong-6 as a Bangladesh Awami League candidate in 1973. When Bakshal was formed in 1975, he was appointed Governor of Chittagong North District.

Awards 
Mohammad Khaled was awarded the "Swadhinata Puraskar" by the Government of Bangladesh in 2019 for his unique general contribution to the war of liberation.

Death 
Mohammad Khaled died on 21 December 2003 in Chittagong.

References 

Awami League politicians
1st Jatiya Sangsad members
1922 births
2003 deaths
Recipients of the Independence Day Award
People of the Bangladesh Liberation War
Bangladeshi journalists
University of Calcutta alumni
Chittagong College alumni
People from Chittagong District